"You" is a 1967 single released by American singer Marvin Gaye on the Tamla label.

Background
Released as the first single from Gaye's In the Groove album, it was written by Ivy Jo Hunter, Jack Goga and Jeffrey Bowen and produced by Hunter.

The song talked of a man wanting to keep a rendezvous secret with one woman due to their differing social statuses, Marvin's narrator being working class, while the woman is upper class.

Recorded after Gaye recorded his "I Heard It Through the Grapevine" single, it showcased a new rougher Gaye vocal than usual signaling a change in the singer's direction as he stepped away from the sophisticated-styled soul that dominated his mid-sixties releases.

A modest hit on the pop charts peaking at number thirty-four, it was a top ten single on the R&B charts where it peaked at number seven.

Cash Box said that it has "tremendous rhythmic impact and a big vocal showing."

Chart performance

Credits
Lead vocals by Marvin Gaye
Background vocals by Gladys Knight & the Pips
Instrumentation by The Funk Brothers

Other versions
A jazz instrumental cover of the song, titled "You, Baby", was released by Nat Adderley on his 1968 album of the same name.
Three Dog Night released a version of the song on their 1971 album, Harmony.
Rare Earth recorded this song. It appears on the second volume of Anthology: The Best of Rare Earth.
Judie Tzuke recorded the song for her 1985 album The Cat Is Out.

References 

1967 songs
1967 singles
Songs written by Ivy Jo Hunter
Songs written by Jeffrey Bowen
Marvin Gaye songs
Three Dog Night songs
Tamla Records singles